Sir Charles Alexander Fleming   (9 September 1916 – 11 September 1987) was a New Zealand geologist, ornithologist, molluscan palaeontologist and environmentalist. He spent the last twenty years of his life studying the evolution and systematics of New Zealand cicadas.

Fleming graduated from the University of Auckland in 1952 with a doctoral thesis on the geology of Whanganui.

He was active in the Save Manapouri Campaign, was a spokesperson for Native Forest Action Council and the Royal Forest and Bird Protection Society of New Zealand.  He was elected to the American Philosophical Society in 1973. In 1974 he was elected a Fellow of the Royal Australasian Ornithologists Union.

In 1988 the Royal Society of New Zealand established the Charles Fleming Award which is awarded to individuals who have achieved distinction in the protection, maintenance, management, improvement, or understanding of the environment.

In 1997, Trevor H. Worthy commemorated Charles Fleming in the species' epithet of the prehistoric rail Pleistorallus flemingi from the mid-Pleistocene of New Zealand.

In the 1964 New Year Honours, Fleming was appointed an Officer of the Order of the British Empire. He was promoted to Knight Commander of the Order of the British Empire in the 1977 New Year Honours, for services to science and conservation.

References

Further reading
Royal Society of New Zealand - The Charles Fleming Award for environmental achievement.
National Library of New Zealand (Te Puna Mātauranga o Aotearoa) Biography of Fleming in an exhibition of 20th Century New Zealand Scientists.
Charles Alexander Fleming at http://www.nzbirds.com

1916 births
1987 deaths
New Zealand environmentalists
New Zealand ornithologists
Fellows of the Royal Society of New Zealand
20th-century New Zealand zoologists
New Zealand Knights Commander of the Order of the British Empire
New Zealand Fellows of the Royal Society
Presidents of the Royal Society of New Zealand
Members of the American Philosophical Society